Cairo Stadium Indoor Halls Complex, built in 1991, consists of four multi-use indoor sporting arenas located near the Cairo International Stadium in Cairo, Egypt. The seating capacity of The Main Hall (also known as The Covered Hall), which is primarily used for sports, is 16,900 spectators.

Construction
The complex was completed in September 1991. In 2016, the halls were equipped with an LED lighting system.

Events
 
The Main Hall is used for events like badminton, basketball, handball, volleyball, international conferences, parties, and trade fairs. It was built in time for the 1991 All-Africa Games. It hosted the first FIBA U19 Basketball World Cup on African soil. It is one of the 2020 BAL season venues. 

Other sporting events held at the Complex include:

1999 World Men's Handball Championship
2005 World Judo Championships
2021 World Men's Handball Championship

References

External links

Official website

Indoor arenas in Egypt
Sports venues in Cairo
Judo venues
Volleyball venues in Egypt
Handball venues in Egypt
Badminton venues
1991 establishments in Egypt
Sports venues completed in 1991